Leipsoi (also: Lipsi; anciently, Lepsia) is an island south of Samos and to the north of Leros in Greece. It is well serviced with ferries passing between Patmos and Leros and on the main route for ferries from Piraeus. Leipsoi is a small group of islets at the northern part of the Dodecanese near to Patmos island and Leros. The larger Leipsi-Arkoi archipelago consists of some 37 islands and islets of which only three are larger than : Leipsoi, Arkoi (part of Patmos municipality) and Agreloussa (part of Patmos municipality). Only Leipsoi, Arkoi and Marathos are inhabited. Leipsoi is a municipality, part of the Kalymnos regional unit, which is part of the South Aegean region. In ancient times, it contained a town named Lepsia.

Geography
The island contains springs at Fountani, alias Pikri Nero, in the area near Kimissi along with other minor springs also flowing in this region. The Cave of Ontas dominates the settlement. A  paved path carved into the hill connects the upper quarters of Kimissi  with the lower ones.

Economy

Local products, namely thyme honey (produced the traditional way), wine, cheese, dairy products (touloumotyri cheese, the local version of mizithra) and grapes. Also loom-woven fabrics, carpets and "fookadia" (cloth pouches used to strain cheese).

Moschato Bay in the north on this island has been spoilt by fish farming. The water in this bay is often very cloudy with fish farm wastage. The less protected beaches are not polluted and easily reached by the road network. Roads have recently been reconstructed using European Union funding.

Landmarks

There are several churches and monasteries scattered around the island dedicated to a multitude of saints. These include the church of Aghios Nektarios, built in or about 1980 by father Nikiforos, the parochial priest of Lipsi at the time and a favorite baptistry for the inhabitants of the island.

Panaghia tou Harou: architectural style (purely islander, Byzantine in perception yet austere and unpretentious). Once specialists decide to study this construction more closely, there may be some interesting conclusions drawn relating to the time the church was built (some time between the 7th and 8th century AD.
There is a holy icon of the Virgin in this church, reputed to be of miraculous powers, depicting Mary holding Jesus Crucified. The uniqueness of the concept and the artfulness of the rendition make of this icon one of the brightest moments in hagiography.
Aghios Ioannis Theologos (St. John Evangelist), whose construction was financed by Lipsian emigrants. The church of Kimissis tis Theotokou (Dormition of Mary), dominating the little bay bearing the same name. Also to be found there are reliquaries containing the remains of monks reduced to martyrdom, slain by the Turks during the Ottoman rule. Five of those monks have recently been glorified (canonized) by decree of the Ecumenical Patriarch of Constantinople.
The church of Panaghia (the Virgin) at Kouselio, built on the foundations of an early Christian church. Embedded in the walls of this church - and therefore still to be uncovered - are inscription-bearing marbles of that earlier construction that were later used as building material for the new church. There are also two churches dedicated to St. Nicholas on the hills on either side of the mouth of the port, along with the churches of Aghios Theologos tou Moschatou (17th century), Aghios Spiridion (at Katsadia), Profitis Ilias - a church dedicated to Prophet Elijah and built on top of a hill dominating the port, in accordance with the perennial tradition of churches dedicated to this Prophet to be built in elevated locations.

References

Islands of Greece
Dodecanese
Municipalities of the South Aegean
Populated places in Kalymnos (regional unit)
Landforms of Kalymnos (regional unit)
Islands of the South Aegean